For the California beverage company, see Kern's (beverage company)

Kern's, or The Ernst Kern Dry Good Company, was a department store established in Detroit in 1883 by Ernst Kern, who was born in Germany. In 1886, the original store was consumed by fire and was rebuilt at Randolph and Monroe. In 1900, the company purchased a five story building at Woodward and Gratiot to accommodate increasing business.

When Ernst Kern died in 1901, his sons Ernst C. and Otto assumed control of the store. After World War I, additional space was once again needed for expansion, and the department store acquired the adjoining nine-story Weber Building. In 1957, the family decided to sell Ernst Kern Co., by then Detroit's third-largest department store, to Sattler's Inc. of Buffalo, New York. Following numerous corporate problems and changes in management, the store closed its doors for the final time on December 23, 1959.

The store was demolished in the 1960s as part of Detroit's downtown urban renewal. The site remained an undeveloped park until 1999, when the Campus Martius Park project began. The former site of Kern's is now occupied by the Compuware corporate headquarters. A parking garage for Compuware is on the site formerly occupied by the neighboring Crowley's Department Store.

The clock which graced the main entrance was a long-time meeting place for Detroiters, with the phrase "I'll meet you under the clock at Kern's" a common reminder.  When the structure was demolished, the clock was placed into storage.  It was reinstalled near its original location in the late 1970s.  It was removed and refurbished to allow for construction of the Compuware Building and installed again in 2008 at the corner of Woodward and Gratiot Avenues.

See also 
Hudson's
Crowley's

References

 Service And Style: How the American Department Store Fashioned the Middle Class by Jan Whitaker, page 28
 Dreaming Suburbia: Detroit and the Production of Postwar Space and Culture by Amy Maria Kenyon, page 128

External links
 Ernst Kern Co. at Wayne State University Libraries
 Photo: Looking up Woodward Avenue circa 1917

Defunct department stores based in Michigan
Retail companies established in 1883
Companies based in Detroit
Retail companies disestablished in 1959
Culture of Detroit
1883 establishments in Michigan
1959 disestablishments in Michigan